Calclacite is a mineral and an organic compound. Its name references the components, which are calcium ions (Ca2+), chloride (Cl−) and acetate CH3COO−.

Characteristics 

Calclacite is an organic compound with chemical formula Ca(CH3COO)Cl·5H2O. It forms crystals in the monoclinic system, with silky hairlike efflorescences up to 4 cm long.

According to the Nickel-Strunz classification, calclacite is an organic acid salt and occurs with formicaite (calcium formate), acetamide, dashkovaite (magnesium acetate), paceite (calcium copper acetate) and hoganite (copper acetate). It is white and its hardness on the Mohs scale is 1.5.

Formation 
Calclacite is formed on samples of rocks, fossils, and on fragments of ceramics, by the action of acetic acid produced from the oak of the storage cabinets.

References 

Organic minerals
Calcium minerals
Acetates
Chlorides
Mixed anion compounds